Flat Creek is a stream in Franklin County in the U.S. state of Missouri. It is a tributary of the Bourbeuse River.
 
Flat Creek is characterized by flat rocks in its bottom, hence the name.

See also
List of rivers of Missouri

References

Rivers of Franklin County, Missouri
Rivers of Missouri